The Intel i486SL is the power-saving variant of the i486DX microprocessor. The SL was designed for use in mobile computers. It was produced between November 1992 and June 1993. Clock speeds available were 20, 25 and 33 MHz. The i486SL contained all features of the i486DX.

In addition, the System Management Mode (SMM) (the same mode introduced with i386SL) was included with this processor. The system management mode makes it possible to shut down the processor without losing data. To achieve this, the processor state is saved in an area of static RAM (SMRAM).

In mid-1993, Intel incorporated the SMM feature in all its new 80486 processors and discontinued the SL series.

Refer to the respective section of the list of Intel microprocessors for technical details.

80486Sl